Phassodes is a moth genus of the family Hepialidae. , it is monospecific, consisting of the sole species Phassodes vitiensis; this species is very variable. It is found in Fiji and Samoa. The life cycle is unknown but the larva is presumed to feed underground on the roots of plants or decaying matter.

Taxonomic history
The British entomologist George Thomas Bethune-Baker first circumscribed the genus Phassodes in 1905. He included six species, all of which he described in the same work. In 1950, the French entomologist Pierre Viette synonymized Bethune-Baker's P. nausori with P. vitiensis; P. vitiensis was first described by Walter Rothschild in 1895.

References

Works cited

External links

 

Hepialidae
Monotypic moth genera
Taxa named by George Thomas Bethune-Baker
Exoporia genera
Moths of Oceania